The Phunk Junkeez is an American rap rock band from Phoenix, Arizona that formed in 1991. The group's original lineup consisted of vocalists Joe Valiente (Soulman) and Kirk Reznik (K-Tel Disco). Other members rotated through over the years. 

The band plays music using a number of different styles, from hardcore punk to trip-hop. They established a strong underground following in the 1990s as one of the first punk rock-based bands to combine elements of funk, hip-hop, and soul, preceding the larger rap-rock movement of the decade. The band is notable for being one of the first to include a DJ within a traditional four-piece rock band. 

The Phunk Junkeez released six albums, and they contributed to numerous commercials and film soundtracks. They are perhaps best known for their crossover hit "I Love It Loud" from the 1995 Tommy Boy soundtrack. The band has toured extensively throughout the U.S. as well as Europe and Japan.

History
The Phunk Junkeez founders, Kirk Reznik and Joe Valiente, started performing prerecorded beats under the name "White Boy Rap," a name Soulman used for solo performances.  Later, they performed as an opening act for artists such as MC Hammer and Run-D.M.C. That project turned into "BumRap" in 1987, followed by the "Phunk Junkeez" in 1990. 

Kirk & Joe then merged with local band, "Freak Squad." Freak Squad band members included Jumbo Jim (bassist), Mike Kramer (guitarist), and Disco Danny Dynamite (a.k.a. Disco Danny D, Disco Dan, DK Mueller) on drums. Soon the group added Jeff Scott (aka DJ Roach Clip). The Phunk Junkeez performed in the Valley throughout the early 1990s, playing illegal warehouse raves and clubs around the Phoenix area. 

The band released their self-titled debut album in 1992. This album was one of the most popular local releases from a Phoenix band in 1992 and 1993, gaining interest from major record labels. The Phunk Junkeez were signed to Trauma Records/Interscope Records, and they released their second album, Injected (1995), nationwide. This release was primarily recorded in Atlanta and produced by Angelo Moore of Fishbone and Ross Robinson (Korn, Slipknot, At the Drive-In). Injected produced the successful single, "I Love it Loud (Injected Mix)," which was played in rotation on alternative stations throughout the country, accompanied by a video featuring Chris Farley and David Spade, and was featured on the Tommy Boy soundtrack. "I Love it Loud (Injected Mix)" eventually reached a peak of 38 on the U.S. Billboard Hot 100. Another track from the album B-Boy Hard was featured on the soundtrack to National Lampoon's Senior Trip. 

The Phunk Junkeez toured extensively during this time, playing with No Doubt, Bush, Faith No More, Ramones, and KMFDM, but mostly with 311.  The Phunk Junkeez were given a shout out in the song "Jackolantern's Weather" from 311's self-titled album released in 1995 as well as 311's "Misdirected Hostility", which was written after 311 witnessed a fight between Reznik and then guitarist Jeff O'Rourke, and then a second brawl on that same tour between Reznik and Disco Danny D.

While opening for Dada at a September 24, 1993 concert at the Mesa Amphitheater in Mesa, Arizona, Phunk Junkeez had to be pulled from the stage after playing for several minutes past the city curfew. Despite the requests of producer, Brad Laughlin, and threats to call the police, the Phunk Junkeez would not allow Laughlin to interrupt the set. This forced the venue to shut off the PA system. The band kept playing with only stage amplifiers, but soon the lights were turned off as well. Once backstage, the band's leader, K-Tel Disco, tossed tables and chairs, and threatened the producers of the event, who left without paying the band. By then, a large percentage of the audience had left the venue before they even got to see Dada perform. During the Phunk Junkeez sound check, the obscenities were loud enough that the band was banned from playing at Mesa Amphitheater for many years. They were scheduled to play the venue again in 2003, but they left before taking the stage after a dispute with the Insane Clown Posse, who wanted them to open the show, instead of 2 Live Crew. 

After numerous negative incidents between Reznik and the rest of the band members over the next year, Reznik was voted out of the band. After his departure, the band immediately went on tour, bringing along a mobile recording studio to record their next album. The ideas written while on tour became the basis of Fear of a Wack Planet, which was recorded in Amsterdam, produced by Lee Popa, and released in 1998. The band then began touring more frequently, with acts such as Incubus, Shootyz Groove, The Urge, Insane Clown Posse, 2 Skinnee J's, and Clutch. Jeff O'Rourke quit the band after the bulk of this touring to pursue a film career.

In 1999, Danny P replaced Jeff O'Rourke on guitar, and the band began writing their next album. Danny P was a member of the local Phoenix band Surf Ballistics. The band has said that Danny P sparked creativity with the band and was a driving force during their next four releases. With Danny P, the band had new energy, and became very popular on the national underground scene. They toured worldwide (South America, Canada, Japan, Mexico, China). The band quickly recorded "Junk EP" on their newly formed independent record label, "Uncle Scam Records." The band found themselves on national TV on MTV, MTV2, and USA Network when they put out a high-budget music video for the song "Bounce." The Junkeez also got heavy local/national radio spins for the song "American Pimp". 

With the EP selling very well, and the band playing radio festivals, they quickly decided to go into the studio to record a new album. They built a state-of-the-art studio in downtown Phoenix, Arizona. and hired producer Jeff Poe (Santana, Guns N' Roses). The album was mixed and parts were also recorded at Can/Nam studios in California. The studio was the home for other records such as Tupac's All Eyez on Me. In January 2001, the band released Sex, Drugs and Rap N' Roll (2001). This marked the start of the band becoming more underground. On this and the next three albums, bassist Jumbo Jim took over as the band's recording engineer. New MC Milky (Soulman's little brother) also joined the band at this time to rap alongside Roach and Soulman. This release was produced and mixed by Jeff Poe. One of the singles off the album, What's Next, featured a collaboration with Sen Dog of Cypress Hill.

After four albums and 11 years of touring, Drummer "Disko" Dan Mueller left the Phunk Junkeez to pursue other musical endeavors. The Phunk Junkeez added Steve "Dukes" Dueck. During the Sex, Drugs and Rap N' Roll tour, they joined up with Suburban Noize Records while supporting Kottonmouth Kings for most of the spring and summer of 2002. They abandoned the tour they were headlining to join the Kottonmouth Kings tour canceling all of their previously scheduled shows without notifying any of the venues. Concertgoers arrived, but were informed that the band had not yet arrived. Only later did frustrated venue managers, who were unable to get in touch with the band, visit the band's website and learn of the change in the tour. 

The band began to tour over 200 days a year on both major and secondary markets .The Phunk Junkeez then signed a record deal with Suburban Noize. They released their fifth album, Rock It Science, the following year. After tracking drums for this album, Dukes left the band (he returned in 2007) for family reasons and was replaced by Money Mike on drums. This album was produced by Jumbo Jim and Soulman, recorded by Jumbo Jim, and mixed by Ken Mary. The songs, "Same Ole Song" and "Fall in Line," from Rock It Science, appeared on the soundtrack to Harold & Kumar Go to White Castle. The band again toured extensively for this release. 

On August 23, 2007, the Phunk Junkeez released their most recent album, entitled Hydro Phonic. This album was also produced by Jumbo Jim and Soulman, engineered by Jumbo Jim, and mixed by Ken Mary.

Upon completing another tour of the U.S. and Japan, DJ Soulman struck out alone on a DJ tour of Japan. The Phunk Junkeez continue to play shows but have slowed their extensive touring, only playing select cities and dates.

Members

Current members
 Joe Valiente "Soulman" (vocals) 1991–present
 Kirk Reznick "K-Tel Disco" (vocals) 1991–1995, 2016–present
 "Jumbo" Jim Woodling (bass guitar) 1992–present
 Jeff Scott "DJ Roachclip" (turntables/samples) 1992–present

Past members
 Mike Kramer (guitar) 1992–1993
 Jeff O’Rourke (guitar) 1994–1999, 2016–2018
 Danny P (guitar) 1999–2016
 Daniel Mueller (drums) 1992–2000, 2016–2018
 Mike Hill (drums) 2003–2016
 Jesse Valiente (vocals) 2001-2010

Touring and Studio members
 Todd Mahoney (guitar) 1991
 Jeff Holmes (Bass) 
 Tony McClain (guitar) 1993
 Steve Dukes (drums) 2001–2002
 Richard Picklesworth (samples) 2000–2004

Discography

Albums

Singles

Videography

Filmography

References

External links
 

Musical groups established in 1991
Rock music groups from Arizona
Musical groups from Phoenix, Arizona
1991 establishments in Arizona
Rap rock groups
Rap metal musical groups
Southern hip hop groups